Graeme Campbell (born 13 August 1939) is an Australian far-right politician. Campbell represented the vast seat of Kalgoorlie in the Australian House of Representatives from 1980 to 1998 as a member of the Australian Labor Party. Campbell later founded the  nationalist Australia First Party, before joining Pauline Hanson's One Nation.

Biography
Campbell was born in Abingdon, Oxfordshire, England, and came to Australia as a child. He was educated at Urrbrae Agricultural High School in South Australia. In 1972, Campbell met his future wife, French-Australian Michele Lelievre, at a sheep station in the Nullarbor Plain. Campbell worked in a range of occupations before entering federal parliament in October 1980 as the Labor member for Kalgoorlie.

Considered a maverick, he was an ardent supporter of the mining industry, and crossed the floor on gold tax in 1988, and was also a vocal critic of the Mabo decision and sanctions on the apartheid regime in South Africa, and a proponent of uranium mining. In October 1993, and again in May 1995, he delivered a speech at the national seminar of the Australian League of Rights, a far-right group for which he was believed to hold sympathies, and in by-elections in Mackellar and Warringah (safe Liberal seats on the Northern Beaches of Sydney) in 1994, he urged electors to vote for Australians Against Further Immigration (AAFI).

After numerous run-ins with the Labor leadership and considerable media attention to his exploits, he was finally expelled from the party on 30 November 1995 after addressing an AAFI meeting where he criticised Labor's immigration policies. He continued to sit in parliament as an independent, and was reelected as an independent in the 1996 election, when he only received 35% of the primary vote, but defeated the Labor candidate, former Deputy Premier of Western Australia Ian Taylor, on Liberal preferences.

In June 1996, Campbell founded the Australia First Party, but was officially reckoned as an independent. He was defeated for reelection at the 1998 federal election after being eliminated on the seventh count. Campbell blamed his loss on Australia First being eclipsed by One Nation. In 2009, he claimed that, if not for the presence of a One Nation candidate, he would have picked up an additional 8.5% of the vote, which would have been enough to keep him in the race.

He remained Australia First's leader until June 2001, when he left the party to stand (unsuccessfully) as a One Nation Senate candidate in Western Australia. In 2004, he attempted unsuccessfully to regain his old federal seat as an independent. He stood for the Senate in Western Australia at the 2007 federal election as an independent, but only achieved 0.13% of the vote.

Electoral performance

House

2004

1998

1996

1993

1990

1987

1984

1983

1980

Senate

References

Bibliography
 Graeme Campbell and Mark Uhlmann. Australia Betrayed: How Australian democracy has been undermined and our naive trust betrayed, Foundation Press, Perth, 1995. 

1939 births
Living people
Pauline Hanson's One Nation politicians
Independent members of the Parliament of Australia
Australian Labor Party members of the Parliament of Australia
Members of the Australian House of Representatives
Members of the Australian House of Representatives for Kalgoorlie
English emigrants to Australia
People from Abingdon-on-Thames
Australia First Party members of the Parliament of Australia
20th-century Australian politicians
Australian conspiracy theorists